Per Sarto Jørgensen (born 3 March 1944) is a former Danish cyclist. He competed at the 1964 Summer Olympics and the 1968 Summer Olympics.

References

External links
 

1944 births
Living people
Danish male cyclists
Olympic cyclists of Denmark
Cyclists at the 1964 Summer Olympics
Cyclists at the 1968 Summer Olympics
Sportspeople from the Central Denmark Region